Now is the eighth studio album by Australian blues musician Ash Grunwald. The album  was released in September 2015, peaking at number 52 on the ARIA Charts.

Grunwald called the album "modern psychedelic, sci-fi, swamp rock, blues album, if there is such a thing".

Reception

Colin Morris from Stuff NZ said "Aimed squarely at the blues market that think it's simply 12 bars and an electric guitar, Grunwald wants you on the dancefloor screamin' shoutin' and crunching the beats underfoot. I love, even though at parts it's overblown, the sheer swagger of this disc. It's got a big heart mixed into a big sound."

Track listing

Charts

Release history

References

2015 albums
Ash Grunwald albums